Simone Corsi (born 24 April 1987) is an Italian former Grand Prix motorcycle racer. Born in Rome, Corsi has been racing in motorcycle world championships for nearly 20 years, amassing over 300 races, 4th all-time, behind only Valentino Rossi, Andrea Dovizioso and Loris Capirossi.

Career

125cc World Championship
Corsi's first Grand Prix race was in the 125cc category, in 2002 at Mugello, and riding a Honda RS125R he finished the race in 22nd. From the following year on, he would compete regularly in the world championship's levels.

Kopron Team Scot (2003–2004)
In 2003, Corsi rode a Honda for Scot Racing Team, along with teammate Andrea Dovizioso. He achieved nine point scoring finishes, a season's best result of 9th in two races, and finished 19th in the final standings with 32 points. 

In the following year he improved, finishing in the points ten times, finishing in the top-10 four times, and scoring his first podium with a 3rd place in Japan, with Dovizioso winning the race. Corsi ended the season 13th in the final standings with 61 points, while his teammate Dovizioso won the World Championship title with 293 points.

250cc World Championship
For 2005 both Corsi and Dovizioso moved up to 250cc, but were now riding different bikes. Corsi had a good first half of the year, as he finished in the points in seven of the eight races. However, in the second half's eight races he finished in the points only once, ending the season 14th in the standings, with 59 points.

Return to 125cc

Squadra Corse Metis Gilera (2006)
Corsi returned to the 125cc class for 2006 with Gilera, but he fell short of an impressive season, two fourth places were the best results of his year, and he finished 12th in the championship, with 79 points.

Skilled Racing Team (2007)
In 2007, he won his first Grand Prix race at the Turkish Grand Prix in Istanbul, and finished 3rd in Mugello. Corsi ended the season 6th in the standings, with 168 points, both being career high totals so far.

Jack & Jones WRB (2008)
For 2008, Corsi received a factory spec Aprilia RSA 125 and he was seen as a title favourite for the year. Corsi won races in Jerez, Estoril, Mugello, and the season closer in Valencia, and also finished 3rd in Assen, Rimini, and Sepang, but ultimately finished 2nd in the championship with 225 points, 39 points behind the Derbi of Mike Di Meglio, who also won four races himself, winning the title.

Fontana Racing (2009)
For 2009, it had been speculated that Corsi would ride for the Scot Honda team in 250cc's, but he continued in 125cc with Aprilia, in one last hope of winning the World Championship. It was a down year for him, finishing on the podium only twice (a 2nd place in Donnington, and a 3rd place in Indianapolis), and concluded his career's final year of the 125cc category with only 81 points, good for 11th in the rider's standings.

Moto2 World Championship

Team JiR (2010)
In 2010, Corsi stepped up to the new intermediate class, Moto2, for Team JiR. He scored his first podium, and his team's first podium in the intermediate class, with a 3rd place at Le Mans, moving into third place in the championship standings temporarily. He added another 3rd placed podium at Mugello, but a crash at both Silverstone and the Sachsenring put a dent his championship hopes. He finished the season well, with regular top-10 finishes, ending his second season in the intermediate class (following the debut 2005 season) 5th in the rider's championship, with 138 points.

IodaRacing Project (2011–2012)
In 2011, Corsi now riding for IodaRacing Project, he basically replicated his 2010 season, scoring two 3rd place finishes (this time in Jerez, and Aragón), and finishing 6th in the final standings, with 127 points.

For the 2012 season Corsi stayed with the IodaRacing Project team, and regressed, not scoring any podiums during the year, his highest finish being three 5th places in Barcelona, Silverstone and Brno, ending the year a disappointing 11th in the standings, with 88 points.

Forward Racing (2013–2015)
Switching teams again, Corsi would ride for Forward Racing in the 2013 Moto2 World Championship, and have his usual season, riding mostly in the middle of the pack, a regular points finisher, occasional top-10 finishes, and one podium, this time coming as a 2nd place in Germany. He finished the year 11th in the rider's championship, with 108 points.

Staying with Forward Racing, Corsi was partnered by Mattia Pasini for the 2014 season, and had a very half and half year. He started the season off well, with three straight 5th place finishes in Qatar, Texas, and Argentina, before a retirement in Jerez. This was followed by a 2nd place in Le Mans, a 4th place in Mugello, and another retirement in Barcelona. A 3rd place in Germany was followed up by a 5th place in Indianapolis, a 12th place in Brno, and a retirement in Silverstone, where he broke his left arm. Corsi underwent a four hour operation at the John Radcliffe Hospital in Oxford to fix the open and displaced fracture of the ulna of his left arm, reducing and fixing the fracture with a plaque and screws. During the surgery, the doctors discovered injuries to the extensor tendons of the wrist, that were also repaired. These severe injuries saw Corsi miss the remaining six races of the season rehabbing, prematurely ending his 2014 season. He still managed to finish the year 7th in the standings, with 100 points.

For the 2015 Moto2 World Championship, Corsi's teammate at Forward Racing was Lorenzo Baldassarri. He started the season off poorly, being involved in a crash with Esteve Rabat in the season opener in Qatar, causing both riders to retire from the race. In Mugello, he was involved in a collision with Sam Lowes, in which Corsi turned in on Lowes, causing himself to crash, Lowes managing to go on, eventually finishing 4th. Altogether, Corsi had an average year, scoring no podiums, his season's best results were two 4th places in Germany and San Marino, and finished 12th overall in the rider's championship, with 86 points.

Speed Up Racing (2016–2017)
In 2016, Corsi joined Speed Up to replace Sam Lowes, who left to Gresini Racing. Corsi had his usual year, starting the season off really well, scoring a 3rd place in the season opener at Qatar, and a 2nd place in Le Mans, the fifth race of the season. In Austin, with 5 laps remaining, he tried overtaking Takaaki Nakagami in the first corner, going up the inside of the Japanese rider when there was no room, causing Nakagami to crash. He was placed under investigation by race direction, but it was subsequently deemed a racing incident. In Barcelona, he was investigated after making contact with Lorenzo Baldassari in a chicane, but it too was deemed a racing incident. He had a similar incident with Nakagami in Brno that year as in Austin, but this time Corsi receiving a ride-through penalty for dangerous riding. He would score points regularly during the rest of the year, but had no further podiums, finishing 10th in the standings, with 103 points.

Staying with Speed Up for the 2017 season, Corsi would continue his bad habit of being involved in crashes, this time in Jerez, where he was involved in his third collision with Nakagami and his first with Xavi Vierge. Corsi tried to overtake too many riders into turn one, lost the front, and took out all three of them from the race. Overall he had another average year, finishing with no podiums, a season's best of 4th in Germany, 117 points, and 9th in the championship.

Tasca Racing Scuderia Moto2 (2018–2019)
Corsi switched to team Tasca Racing for the 2018 season, partnering Federico Fuligni. Corsi had a weaker year, seeing the checkered flag in the top-10 only four times, and finished 14th in the rider's championship with 53 points.

In 2019, Corsi had his Grand Prix career's worst year, finishing in the points only twice in the first 9 races of the season, an 8th place in Austin and a 14th place in Barcelona. His poor performances led to Tasca Racing replacing him with ex-teammate Mattia Pasini from the Brno round onwards, after the summer break. Corsi thus finished with only 10 points, 24th in the rider's championship.

MV Agusta Forward Racing (2020–2022)
Corsi made his return to MV Agusta Forward Racing for the 2020 season, partnering Stefano Manzi, and continued declining in his performances. He finished in the points only six times, and only finished in the top-10 once, a 10th place finish in Aragon. He ended the year 24th in the championship again, this time with 15 points.

Partnered by Lorenzo Baldassarri at Forward for the 2021 Moto2 World Championship, Corsi started the year off in the worst way possible, a high-side in the opening round of Qatar, resulting in a compound fracture in his left wrist. He was replaced for the second round by Tommaso Marcon, and for the third by Miquel Pons, with rumours starting to circle whether or not it was going to be his last year. He finished 9th in Le Mans, 10th in Aragon, and 13th in Austin, and the following weekend in Misano saw Corsi start his 300th career race, becoming only the 5th rider after Loris Capirossi, Valentino Rossi, Andrea Dovizioso, and Thomas Lüthi to achieve this feat. The final round in Valencia saw him take an unexpected pole position in qualifying, his first pole in nearly nine years, but on the warm-up lap Corsi's bike stalled, and he entered the pits in tears, unable to start the race from the front of the grid due to a technical issue. He ended the season 24th in the standings with 16 points, and was extended for another year by Forward Racing for his brilliant pole position.

In what is due to be Corsi's 20th and final season in Grand Prix racing, he will be joined by teammate Marcos Ramírez at Forward Racing for the 2022 Moto2 season. The year was a major disappointment, with Corsi failing to score a point and he and Ramirez were never really looking competitive because of a bike with not many upgrades and tensions between Forward Racing and MV Agusta (now being bought by KTM) with Corsi being replaced by Álex Escrig, ending his long career in Grand Prix racing.

Later years
It was later announced that Corsi would be retained by MV Agusta as a coach and test rider, with the possibility of doing some wild card rides both on the European and the World championships. He also tried to join the World Supersport paddock (by also winning 2 races out of the 2 he raced in the Italian championship), but he could not find a ride for 2023.

Career statistics

Grand Prix motorcycle racing

By season

By class

Races by year
(key) (Races in bold indicate pole position, races in italics indicate fastest lap of the race)

References

External links

1987 births
Living people
Italian motorcycle racers
Sportspeople from Rome
125cc World Championship riders
250cc World Championship riders
Moto2 World Championship riders
Motorcycle racers of Fiamme Oro